The Archives nationales d'outre-mer in Aix-en-Provence is a branch of the Archives Nationales of France that documents the French colonial empire. According to one scholar, "half the history of France overseas was represented in the mass of papers" first assembled in Aix in 1966. The materials originated in various offices and repositories scattered throughout the colonies. The Dépôt des Archives d'Outre-Mer opened in 1966, and its successor, the Centre des Archives d'Outre-Mer, in 1987. It was later renamed the "Archives nationales d'outre-mer." Its facilities occupy a site near the Université de Provence Aix-Marseille I.

The archives groups its holdings by ministry, territory, document format (images, maps); it also has non-government materials. In 1986 the main national archives in Paris transferred to Aix its records of the "Section outre-mer." In 1995 the archives received substantial additional materials generated by colonial offices. Directors have included Martine Cornède (2007-2014) and Benoît Van Reeth (2014–present).(fr)

Images
Examples of items held in ANOM

See also
 History of Overseas France 
 List of French possessions and colonies
 List of ministers of Overseas France

References

This article incorporates information from the French Wikipedia.

Bibliography
In English
 
  (Includes a chapter on ANOM)

In French
  
  
  
  (+ contents)

External links

 Official site
 Catalog (IREL), official site
 List of inventories of materials in the ANOM
 VIAF. Archives nationales d'outre-mer 

1966 establishments in France
Government agencies of France
France
Archives in France
Buildings and structures in Aix-en-Provence
History of Overseas France
French colonial empire